Ghamar (3D radar) (Persian: رادار سه بعدی قمر) is an Iranian native production in electronic warfare. This radar can coverage and search in three dimensions (3D) and distance of more than 450 kilometers. Ghamar can track more than 100 targets such as fighter aircraft and drones. The radar send data to Absar video-imaging system that can set up on fighter jets and drones. Ghamar radar were unveiled with another defense products during the ceremony by Brigadier General Hossein Dehghan, Iran’s defense minister.

See also  

 List of military equipment manufactured in Iran

References 

Military radars of Iran
Ground radars
Military equipment introduced in the 2010s